John Woodland Crisfield (November 8, 1806 – January 12, 1897) was a U.S. Congressman from Maryland, representing the sixth district from 1847 to 1849 and the first district from 1861 to 1863.  The city of Crisfield, Maryland, is named after him. Crisfield was a strong supporter of the Union during American Civil War, opposing moves towards Maryland's secession. However, Crisfield also supported the institution of slavery and worked to prevent its abolition in Maryland.

Early life
Crisfield was born near Galena, Maryland, in Kent County on the Eastern Shore of Maryland, Crisfield was educated at Washington College in Chestertown, Maryland.  He studied law, and was admitted to the bar in 1830, commencing practice in Princess Anne, Maryland.

Career in politics
Crisfield entered the Maryland House of Delegates in 1836, and was later elected as a Whig to the Thirtieth Congress, serving the 6th Congressional district of Maryland from March 4, 1847 until March 3, 1849.  He was a delegate to the State constitutional convention in 1850, and a member of the peace conference of 1861 held in Washington, D.C., in an effort to devise means to prevent the impending American Civil War.

Congress, war and the question of slavery
In 1861, Crisfield was elected as a Unionist to the Thirty-seventh Congress from the 1st Congressional district of Maryland, serving one term from March 4, 1861 until March 3, 1863.

Although Maryland remained loyal to the Union at the outbreak of the American Civil War, Maryland was divided on the question of slavery and the emancipation of Maryland slaves remained by no means a foregone conclusion. On December 16, 1861 a bill was presented to Congress to emancipate slaves in Washington D.C., and in March 1862 Lincoln held talks with Crisfield on the subject of emancipation. Crisfield however argued that freedom would be worse for the slaves than slavery, especially in time of war, but such arguments could no longer hold back the abolitionist tide.

On July 17, 1862, the U.S. Congress passed the Confiscation Act of 1862, which permitted the Union army to enlist African-American soldiers, and barred the army from recapturing runaway slaves. In July 1862 Lincoln offered to buy out Maryland slaveholders, offering $300 for each emancipated slave, but Crisfield rejected the offer.

On January 1, 1863, President Lincoln issued the Emancipation Proclamation which declared all slaves in Southern states to be free, but Maryland, like other border states, was exempted since Maryland had remained in the Union. However, in 1863 and 1864 growing numbers of Maryland slaves simply left their plantations to join the Union Army, accepting the promise of freedom in return for military service. One effect of this was to bring slave auctions to an end, as any slave could avoid sale by simply offering to join the U.S. Army.

In 1863 Crisfield was defeated in local elections by the abolitionist candidate John Creswell, amid allegations of vote-rigging by the army.

After being defeated at the polls, Crisfield resumed the practice of law.

After the War
Crisfield served as a delegate to the National Union Convention in Philadelphia, Pennsylvania in 1866.

He was instrumental in building the Eastern Shore Railroad and served as president, connecting it to the fishing town of Somers Cove which was growing rapidly due to the seafood industry there.  This town was renamed Crisfield in his honor.  A rural road in Princess Anne, called Crisfield Lane and passing next to his homeplace, 'Edge Hill', is also named after him.  He died in Princess Anne in 1897, and is interred in Manokin Presbyterian Cemetery.

References

 Rhodes, Jason, Somerset County, Maryland: a Brief History Retrieved August 11, 2010

Notes

1806 births
1897 deaths
People from Kent County, Maryland
Whig Party members of the United States House of Representatives from Maryland
Unionist Party members of the United States House of Representatives from Maryland
Members of the Maryland House of Delegates
Crisfield, Maryland
People from Princess Anne, Maryland
Crisfield, John W.